is a manga publishing company headquartered in Singapore. The company, a subsidiary of Japanese publisher Shogakukan, opened in 2014.

The books are distributed in Singapore, Malaysia, Indonesia, the Philippines, Thailand and Brunei.

Series

BanG Dream!
The Blood-Tied Lovers
The Butler is King
Detective Conan
Doraemon
Football Nation
Future Card Buddyfight
Koba Cute!
Laughter at the World's End
The Legendary Hero Is Dead!
 The LKY Story
Magi: Adventure of Sinbad
Magi: The Labyrinth of Magic
Megane Collection
Mobile Suit Gundam Thunderbolt
Pokémon Adventures
Silver Spoon
Yo-kai Watch

See also
 Chuang Yi

References

External links
 Shogakukan Asia

Manga distributors
Book publishing companies of Singapore
Shogakukan
Publishing companies established in 2014
Singaporean companies established in 2014